is a Japanese multinational electronics manufacturing corporation headquartered in Shibuya, Tokyo, Japan. Its products include calculators, mobile phones, digital cameras, electronic musical instruments, and analogue and digital watches. It was founded in 1946, and in 1957 introduced the first entirely compact electronic calculator. It was an early digital camera innovator, and during the 1980s and 1990s, the company developed numerous affordable home electronic keyboards for musicians along with introducing the first mass-produced digital watches.

History
Kashio's first major product was the yubiwa pipe, a finger ring that would hold a cigarette, allowing the wearer to smoke the cigarette down to its nub while also leaving the wearer's hands free. Japan was impoverished immediately following World War II, so cigarettes were valuable, and the invention was a success.

After seeing the electric calculators at the first Business Show in Ginza, Tokyo in 1949, Kashio and his younger brothers (Toshio, Kazuo, and Yukio) used their profits from the yubiwa pipe to develop their calculators. Most of the calculators at that time worked using gears and could be operated by hand using a crank or using a motor (see adding machine).

Toshio possessed some knowledge of electronics and set out to make a calculator using solenoids. After dozens of prototypes were tested, the desk-sized calculator was finished in 1954 and was Japan's first electro-mechanical calculator. One of the central and more important innovations of the calculator was its adoption of the 10-key number pad; at that time other calculators were using a "full keypad", which meant that each place in the number (1s, 10s, 100s, etc ...) had nine keys. Another distinguishing innovation was the use of a single display window instead of the three display windows (one for each argument and one for the answer) used in other calculators.

Casio Computer Co., Ltd. was formed in June 1957. That year, Casio released the Model 14-A, sold for 485,000 yen, the first all-electric compact calculator, which was based on relay technology.

In 1974, Casio released their first digital wristwatch, called the CASIOTRON. It was the first wristwatch in the world to include an automatic calendar function. In 1977, they released a retro-futuristic wristwatch, called the F100. The watch was one of the first wristwatches in the world to be made primarily out of resin, making it very light compared to other companies' heavy metal-made watches and enabling future Casio watches to enter mass production more easily. In 1989, Casio released another important wristwatch; the F-91W, the most sold wristwatch in the world with an annual production of 3 million units.

In the 1980s, Casio's budget electronic instruments and its line of affordable home electronic musical keyboard instruments became popular. The company also became well known for the wide variety and innovation of its wristwatches. It was one of the earliest manufacturers of quartz watches, both digital and analog. It also began selling calculator watches during this time. Casio also introduced one of the first watches that could display the time in many different time zones of the world and with features like recording temperature, atmospheric-pressure and altitude. In the later years, Casio's wristwatches were fitted with receivers to synchronise with radio towers around the world and Global Positioning System for timekeeping accuracy.

A number of notable digital camera innovations have also been made by Casio, including the QV-10, the first consumer digital camera with a liquid-crystal display (LCD) on the back (developed by a team led by Hiroyuki Suetaka in 1995), the first consumer three-megapixel camera, the first true ultra-compact model, and the first digital camera to incorporate ceramic lens technology, using Lumicera.

In July 2019, the company's UK arm, Casio Electronics Co. Ltd, was fined £3.7 million after admitting resale price maintenance (a form of price-fixing) on their line of digital keyboards and digital pianos between 2013 and 2018, in breach of the United Kingdom's Competition Act 1998.

Products
Casio's products include watches, calculators, electronic keyboards and other digital products such as digital cameras (Exilim series), film cameras, cash registers, laptops and sub-notebook computers, mobile phones, PDAs (E-Data Bank), electronic dictionaries, digital diaries (early PDAs), electronic games, computer printers, clocks, and portable televisions.

In the 1970s and 80s, Casio was best known for its electronic (including scientific) calculators, electronic musical instruments and affordable digital watches incorporating innovative technology. Today, Casio is most commonly known for making durable and reliable electronic products. The G-Shock range of shock-resistant watches is also very popular, with the original 1983 G-Shock DW-5000C being highly sought-after by collectors. The scientific calculators made by Casio especially the CLASSWIZ series of calculators are known for being affordable while incorporating a host of functions as compared to their competitors.

Casio also makes products for local markets, including "Prayer Compass" watch series designed to help Muslims pray on time and in the right direction.

Gallery

See also

 Casio graphic calculators
 Seiko
 Timex
 Quartz crisis

Notes

References

External links
 
 Casio Worldwide

 
Japanese companies established in 1957
1970s initial public offerings
Companies listed on the Tokyo Stock Exchange
Computer companies established in 1957
Defense companies of Japan
Electronic calculator companies
Electronics companies established in 1957
Electronics companies of Japan
Japanese brands
Mobile phone manufacturers
Audio equipment manufacturers of Japan
Multinational companies headquartered in Japan
Photography companies of Japan
Piano manufacturing companies
Point of sale companies
Synthesizer manufacturing companies of Japan
Watch brands
Watch manufacturing companies of Japan
Watchmaking conglomerates
Wearable computers
Musical instrument manufacturing companies of Japan